The 2014–15 FK Austria Wien season is the 103rd season in club history. They will participate, in the Bundesliga and Austrian Cup.

Background

Background information

Austria Wien finished the 2013–14 season in fourth place and failed to qualify for a spot in Europe. The club would have gone into the Europa League if they had maintained third–place. The Club received their licence on 30 April 2014. Austria Wien signed Marco Meilinger,  Mario Leitgeb, and Jens Stryger Larsen. Rubin Okotie, Tamás Priskin, and Martin Harrer returned from loan spells. However, Okotie eventually transferred to 1860 München. Pascal Grünwald, Marko Stanković, Tomáš Jun, Emir Dilaver, Kaja Rogulj, Lukas Rotpuller, Thomas Murg, and Philipp Hosiner left the club. The clubstarted pre–season on 10 June. They were without Heinz Lindner and Markus Suttner, who were still on vacation, and James Holland, who is on the squad for Australia at the FIFA World Cup, and Rubin Okotie, who was missing for "another reason."

During the 2013–14 season, Nenad Bjelica was sacked as head coach. Herbert Gager was named interim head coach. However, he was sacked after the season and didn't get the permanent job. The club wanted Adi Hütter to become head coach. But he eventually was hired by Red Bull Salzburg to become their new head coach. Then they had talks with Manfred Schmid about the vacant head coach's job. However, 1. FC Köln refused to release him. Köln had demanded a €400,000 transfer fee.  Gerald Baumgartner was announced as the new head coach on 27 May. He received a two–year contract with an option year. He had been head coach of St. Pölten. Renato Gligoroski was named the assistant coach on 6 June. He had been Baumgartner's assistant at St. Pölten.

Transfers

In

Out

Bundesliga

Bundesliga review

Matchdays 1–9
The opening match of the Bundesliga season on 20 July for Austria Wien against Grödig ended in a 1–1 draw. Daniel Schütz gave Grödig the lead prior to Ola Kamara equalising for Austria in stoppage time. There were nine yellow cards in the match. Austria finished the matchday tied for fifth with Grödig. Then on matchday two, on 26 July, Austria lost to Wolfsberg 4–0 with goals from Christopher Wernitznig, Nemanja Rnić, Jacobo Ynclán from the penalty spot, and Sílvio. Vanče Šikov was sent–off in the sixth minute. Austria finished the matchday in seventh place. Austria started August with a 0–0 draw against Altach on matchday three on 2 August. Austria remained winless and dropped down to eighth place, two places above the relegation zone. Then Austria and Wiener Neustadt battled to a 2–2 draw on matchday four on 9 August. Austria got goals from Omer Damari and Alexander Grünwald from the penalty spot  and Daniel Schöpf and Herbert Rauter scored for Wiener Neustadt. Damari only got his work permit the day before. Austria finished the matchday in ninth place. Again, on matchday five on 17 August, Austrias match ended in a draw. The match against Sturm Graz ended 1–1. Daniel Royer opened the scoring in the eighth minute for Austria. However, in the 52nd minute, David Schloffer equalized for Sturm. The result meant that Austria have failed to win any of their last eight matches and four of the last five matches between the two clubs have ended in the same scoreline. Austria remained in ninth place. The 310th Wiener Derby ended in a 2–2 draw on matchday six on 24 August. Austria took the lead twice with a first-minute goal from Alexander Gorgon and a second–half penalty shot from Omer Damari. However, both Robert Berić and Stefan Schwab equalized for Rapid. Austria finished the matchday in eighth place. Austria continued their winless streak on matchday seven on 30 August when they lost 2–1 to Admira Wacker. Eldis Bajrami and Stephan Zwierschitz scored four minutes apart late in the first half to give Admira Wacker the lead. Alexander Grünwald scored early in the second half to pull a goal back. With the result, Austria remained the only team winless and dropped down to 10th and last place. Austria kicked–off September with a 3–1 victory over Ried on matchday eight on 13 September. Omer Damari scored two goals and Daniel Royer scored for Austria and Denis Thomalla scored for Ried. This is Austria's first win of the season. Austria finished the matchday in eighth place. Then, on matchday nine on 21 September, Austria defeated Red Bull Salzburg 3–2. Marco Meilinger, David de Paula, and Omer Damari scored for Austria and Alan scored for Red Bull Salzburg. This was Austria's first victory against Red Bull Salzburg in four years. Austria finished the matchday in seventh place.

Matchdays 10–18

Then, on matchday 10 on 27 September, Austria's match against Grödig finished in a 0–0 draw. The only notable events in the match were the six yellow cards handed out. Austria finished the matchday in sixth place. To kick–off October, Austria lost 2–0 to Wolfsberg on matchday 11 on 4 October. Peter Žulj and Manuel Weber scored for Wolfsberg. Omer Damari didn't play due to Yom Kippur. The loss meant that Austria finished the matchday in sixth place and 15 points behind league leaders Wolfsberg. Then on matchday 12, on 18 October, the Austria–Altach matched finished in a 1–1 draw. Jens Stryger Larsen scored for Austria and Emanuel Schreiner scored for Altach. Markus Suttner injured in the first–half of the match. Austria finished the matchday in sixth place. Then on 25 October, on matchday 13, Austria won their third match of the league season by defeating Wiener Neustadt 2–0 with goals from Daniel Royer and Alexander Grünwald. Tarkan Serbest made his debut for Austria in the starting 11. Austria finished the matchday tied for fifth with Sturm Graz. Austria started November with a 3–0 loss to Sturm Graz with a goal from Marko Stanković and two goals from Marco Djuricin on matchday 14, on 1 November. Stanković opened the scoring in the 15th minute. Then Djuricin added two more goals in the 42nd and 54th minutes. Austria picked up four yellow cards in the match. Austria finished the matchday in seventh place. Then on matchday 15, on 9 November, Austria defeated Rapid Wien 3–2 in the 311th Wiener Derby. Austria took a 3–0 lead through Omer Damari brace in the 23rd minute and 40th minute and a Daniel Royer goal in the 78th minute. But Rapid Wien got two goals late in the match when Deni Alar scored in the 83rd minute and Robert Berić scored in stoppage time. Austria finished the match in sixth place. On 22 November, on matchday 16, Austria defeated Admira Wacker 4–0 with two goals from Alexander Gorgon and a goal each from Omer Damari and Vanče Šikov. Damari opened the scoring in the 61st minute after Richard Windbichler denied Austria a clear goalscoring opportunity. Windbichler received a red card for the foul. Royer scored seven minutes later. Then Gorgon added two goals in the 71st and 82nd minutes. Austria finished the matchday in sixth place. On matchday 17, on 29 November, Austria and Ried played to a 1–1 draw. Alexander Gorgan scored a seventh-minute goal for Austria and Toni Vastić scored in stoppage time to equalize for Ried. Thomas Salamon was sent–off for a second yellow card in the 82nd minute bringing Austria down to 10 men. Austria finished the matchday in sixth place. On matchday 18, on 6 December, Red Bull Salzburg defeated Austria 4–2. Austria took a 2–0 lead with a third-minute goal from Alexander Gorgon and a 21st-minute goal from Alexander Grünwald. Then in the second half, Red Bull Salzburg scored four goals. Alan scored in the 52nd, 58th, and 60th minutes to earn himself a hat-trick. Marcel Sabitzer scored the fourth goal in the 68th minute. Austria finished the matchday in seventh place.

Matchdays 19–27

On matchday 19, on 13 December, Austria defeated Grödig 1–0 with a goal from Marko Kvasina. Kvasina scored in the 77th minute after coming on as a substitute 12 minutes earlier. Austria finished the matchday in sixth place. Austria started their winter break after the match. Austria returned from winter break with training on 5 January. On matchday 20, on 15 February, in Klagenfurt, Austria lost to Wolfsberg 1–0 with a ninth-minute goal from Michael Berger. Austria failed to convert two penalty shots in two shots. Austria finished the matchday in sixth place. On matchday 21, on 21 February, Austria defeated Altach 5–2. Austria got two goals from Alexander Gorgon and a goal each from Fabian Koch, Raphael Holzhauser, and Patrizio Stronati. Altach got two goals from Johannes Aigner. Austria took a 3–0 lead with Koch's opening goal in the 13th minute, Gorgon's goal 11 minutes later and Holzhauser's 54th-minute goal. Then Aigner scored in the 62nd and 63rd minutes to bring Altach within a goal. Then Gorgon got his second goal in the 69th minute. Stronati, who made his debut for the club, finished the scoring in the 86th minute tom make it 5–2. Austria finished the matchday in sixth place. On matchday 22, on 28 February, Wiener Neustadt defeated Austria 1–0 with a 34th-minute penalty from Conor O'Brien. Patrizio Stronati was sent–off on the play that led to the penalty shot. Austria finished the matchday in sixth place. On matchday 23, on 3 March, Sturm Graz defeated Austria 2–1. Alexander Grünwald scored for Austria and Simon Piesinger scored two goals for Sturm Graz. Grünwald gave Austria the lead in the 59th minute. Piesinger then equalized in the 70th minute and then gave Sturm Graz the lead in stoppage time in the second half. Austria finished the matchday in sixth place. In the 312th Wiener derby, on matchday 24, on 8 March, Austria defeated Rapid Wien 2–1. Lukas Rotpuller and Vanče Šikov scored for Austria and Steffen Hofmann scored for Rapid Wien. Hofmann gave Rapid Wien the lead in the 17th minute. Rotpuller scored in stoppage time in the first half and Šikov scored in the 84th minute to give Austria a 2–1 lead. Christian Ramsebner was sent–off for a second bookable offence. Austria finished the matchday in sixth place. The match, on matchday 25, on 14 March, finished in a 1–1 draw. Markus Suttner in the 82nd minute for Austria and Markus Katzer scored in the 85th minute for Admira Wacker. Austria finished the matchday in sixth place. On matchday 26, on 21 March, Ried defeated Austria 1–0 with an 80th-minute goal from Denis Thomalla. Austria finished the matchday in seventh place. The following day, Gerald Baumgartner was sacked and Andreas Ogris was appointed as head coach for the remainder of the season. On 4 April, on matchday 27, Austria lost 3–1 to Red Bull Salzburg. Red Bull Salzburg got two goals from Valentino Lazaro and a goal from Marcel Sabitzer. David de Paula scored for Austria. Sabitzer scored in the first minute to give Red Bull Salzburg a 1–0 lead. De Paula then equalized for Austria. Lazaro then gave Red Bull Salzburg the win with goals in the 23rd and 73rd minutes. Austria finished the matchday in seventh place.

Matchdays 28–36
On matchday 28, on 11 April Austria and Grödig finished their match in a 1–1 draw. Austria finished the matchday in seventh place. On matchday 29, on 19 April, Austria and Wolfsberg finished in a 1–1 draw. Austria finished in seventh place. On matchday 30, on 26 April Austria lost to Rheindorf Altach 2–0. Austria finished the matchday in seventh place. On matchday 31, on 2 May, Austria defeated Wiener Neustadt 2–1. Austria finished the matchday in sixth place. On matchday 32, on 9 May, Austria and Sturm Graz finished their match in a 0–0 draw. Austria finished the matchday in seventh place. In the 313th Weiner Derby, on matchday 34, Rapid Wien defeated Austria 4–1.

Bundesliga fixtures and results

Table

Result summary

Austrian Cup

Austrian Cup review

Austria Wien kicked–off their season with a 6–0 win against First Vienna FC in the first round of the Austrian Cup on 11 July. Austria got two goals from Daniel Royer and a goal each from Martin Harrer, Alexander Gorgon, Roman Kienast, and Alexander Grünwald. Jens Stryger Larsen and Mario Leitgeb both debuted for the club. In the second round, on 24 September, Austria defeated Kitzbühel 5–0 with two goals from Alexander Grünwald and a goal each from Omer Damari, Florian Mader, and Martin Harrer. Then in the third round, Austria advanced to the quarter–finals with a 6–0 win.

Austrian Cup fixtures and results

Player information

Squad and statistics

|-
!Colspan="4"| 
!Colspan="2"| —
!Colspan="2"| 
!Colspan="2"| 
|}

Notes
1.Contract includes an option year.
2.Even though the contract finished after the season, Austria Wien were required to pay a training fee.

References

FK Austria Wien seasons
Austrian football clubs 2014–15 season